Eucalyptus baxteri, commonly known as brown stringybark, is a medium-sized tree that is endemic the south-east of Australia. It has rough, stringy bark to the thinnest branches, lance-shaped or curved adult leaves, green to yellow flower buds in groups of between nine and fifteen, and cup-shaped or hemispherical fruit.

Description
It has grey to brownish, stringy or fibrous bark from the trunk to the thinnest branches. The leaves are the same glossy green on both sides. Flowering mainly occurs from June to January and the flowers are white.

Taxonomy and naming
Brown stringybark was first formally described in 1867 by George Bentham who gave it the name Eucalyptus santalifolia var.? baxteri and published the description in Flora Australiensis. In 1926, John McConnell Black published the name Eucalyptus baxteri in Volume 3 of the Flora of South Australia. The specific epithet (baxteri) honours William Baxter.

Distribution and habitat
Brown stringybark grows in wet forest, woodland, heath and on coastal dunes and headlands in New South Wales, Victoria and South Australia. In New South Wales it only occurs south from the Nadgee Nature Reserve. In Victoria it is found in coastal and near coastal areas and as far inland as places like Casterton, Clunes and the Grampians. It occurs in the far south-east of South Australia, including the Fleurieu Peninsula and Kangaroo Island.

Ecology
The seeds of trees of this species that are over 100 years old are an important source of food for the endangered south-eastern subspecies of the red-tailed black cockatoo.

Gallery

References

Myrtales of Australia
baxteri
Flora of New South Wales
Flora of South Australia
Flora of Victoria (Australia)
Trees of Australia
Trees of Mediterranean climate
Plants described in 1867
Taxa named by George Bentham